William or Bill(y) McMullen may refer to:

William McMullen (politician) (1888–1982), Irish trade unionist and politician
Bill McMullen, American designer who created logo for mid-1990s Flux Television
William Rodney McMullen (born 1960/1961), American business executive
Billy McMullen (born 1980), American football player